Che (Persian: چ) is a 2014 Iranian biographical war film directed by Ebrahim Hatamikia. Che depicts 48 hours of the life of Mostafa Chamran, who was then defense minister of Iran. On August 16 and 17, 1979 he was sent by Ayatollah Khomeini to command several military operations in the civil war in the Kordestan region which was besieged by anti-revolutionary forces.  The film was submitted to the 32nd Fajr International Film Festival. and won two Crystal Simorghs in the fields of best editing and best visual effects. In addition to Chamran the film is also about Asghar Vesali who was killed during the war and the people of Paveh in Kermanshah province.

Title 
Che is the seventh letter in Persian alphabet which is the first letter in Mostafa Chamran's family name.

Plot 

Six months after 1979 Iranian revolution there were some news that Democratic Party of Iranian Kurdistan and Komalah forces in Kordestan are going to fight against Iranian revolutionary forces and take the freedom of the city in the region. Ordered by Ayatullah Khomeini, Mostafa Chamran is sent to the location to clear the city out of Kurdish forces. He has 48 hours.

Cast 
 Fariborz Arabnia as Mostafa Chamran
 Saeed Rad as Valiollah Fallahi
 Babak Hamidian as Asghar Vesali
 Merila Zarei as Hanna
 Payam Laryan as Loyal Soldier
 Mehdi Soltani as Doctor Enayati
 Esmaeel Soltanian as Nazif
 Mohammad Reza Torabi
 Amir Reza Delavari
 Khosrow Shahraz
 Hasan Jamshidi

Poster controversy 
 
Many Iranian websites noticed the similarity between the original Iranian poster design of the film and the poster for the unrelated 2008 film directed by Steven Soderbergh.

References

 ناگفته های حاتمی کیا از «چ»، «چمران» و انتخابات سال 88

External links 
 
 
 

2014 films
2010s Persian-language films
Films directed by Ebrahim Hatamikia
Iranian war films
Iran–Iraq War films
2010s biographical films
2010s war films
Films set in Iran
Iranian biographical films